WhereScape is a privately held international Data Warehouse Automation & Big Data software company. WhereScape was acquired in 2019 by Idera Software.

History 
The company was formerly named Profit Management Systems, but officially renamed to WhereScape in 2001 when expanding business operations into the USA. WhereScape was founded as a data warehouse consulting company in Auckland, New Zealand in 2002 by co-founders Michael Whitehead (President) and Wayne Richmond. 

WhereScape operates out of regional headquarters in Houston, Texas, USA; Reading, United Kingdom; and Singapore. As of 2015, the Company had over 720 customers in more than 15 countries and revenue of around $20 million (NZD). Sales channels vary by country but can be either direct sales or through local partners. WhereScape also has partnerships with third-party companies that embed WhereScape software in their solutions. WhereScape was acquired in 2019 by Idera Software.

In 2020 the company was selected as a finalist for the Specialist Vendor of the Year award 2020.

WhereScape Products 
WhereScape currently offers three main products: WhereScape RED, WhereScape 3D, and Data Vault Express

As of November 2017, version numbers between the two have been aligned and the current stable version is 8.0.1.0.

References

External links 
 

Business intelligence companies
Software companies established in 1997
Software companies of New Zealand
Data warehousing products
Extract, transform, load tools